State Route 64 (SR 64) is an  east–west state highway entirely within Lauderdale County in the northwest portion of the U.S. state of Alabama. The western terminus of the highway is at an intersection with U.S. Route 43 (US 43) near Green Hill, an unincorporated community south of the Tennessee state line. The eastern terminus of the highway is at an intersection with SR 207 north of Anderson.

Route description

SR 64 travels along a two-lane roadway as it travels through northern Lauderdale County. The highway connects the small towns of Anderson and Lexington with US 43, which heads southward into Florence and Muscle Shoals.

Major intersections

See also

References

064
Transportation in Lauderdale County, Alabama